Orient Group Co., Ltd. or Orient Group Inc. is a conglomerate engaged in finance, trading, construction, port, industry, tourism and property development. It is headquartered in Harbin, Heilongjiang, China. It was listed on the Shanghai Stock Exchange in 1994 and it is the first Heilongjiang-based A share listed in Shanghai.

References

External links
 

Conglomerate companies of China
Companies based in Harbin
Conglomerate companies established in 1978
Companies listed on the Shanghai Stock Exchange